Bram de Kort (born 7 June 1991) is a Dutch racing cyclist. He rode at the 2013 UCI Road World Championships.

References

External links
 

1991 births
Living people
Dutch male cyclists
People from Dongen
Cyclists from North Brabant